The Battle of Mosul was a battle in which Kilij Arslan I of the Rum Seljuks conquered Mosul in 1107.

References

Battles involving the Sultanate of Rum
Battles involving Iraq
1107 in Asia
History of Mosul
1100s conflicts